Princess Lilibet of Sussex (Lilibet Diana; born 4 June  2021) is an American-born member of the British royal family. She is the daughter of Prince Harry, Duke of Sussex, and Meghan, Duchess of Sussex. She is a granddaughter of King Charles III and is seventh in the line of succession to the British throne. She was born during the reign of her great-grandmother, Queen Elizabeth II, whose childhood nickname was Lilibet.

Birth, family and infancy
Lilibet Diana Mountbatten-Windsor was born at Santa Barbara Cottage Hospital in Santa Barbara, California, on 4 June 2021 at 11:40 PDT (18:40 UTC). Her birth along with her name were announced two days later. She is named after her paternal great-grandmother, Queen Elizabeth II, who was called "Lilibet" by her family, and her paternal grandmother, Diana, Princess of Wales. Her nickname is "Lili". She is the second child of the Duke and Duchess of Sussex, and has an older brother, Archie. Lilibet is a member of the British royal family and has mixed-race ancestry, having African and European maternal lineage. She has dual citizenship of the United States and the United Kingdom.

In December 2021, the first photograph of Lilibet was released to the public as a Christmas card from her parents.

Lilibet met her great-grandmother Queen Elizabeth II and grandfather King Charles III, then the Prince of Wales, in-person for the first time when the family travelled to London for the Platinum Jubilee of Elizabeth II in June 2022.

She was christened in the Episcopal Church, a province of the Anglican Communion, in a private service at her parents' home on 3 March 2023 by John H. Taylor, the Bishop of Los Angeles. Her godfather is the American actor and comedian Tyler Perry.

Lilibet and her family reside primarily in Montecito, California.

Titles, styles, and succession
At the accession of Charles III, Lilibet became entitled to use the title "princess" and style "royal highness" as the child of a son of the monarch, pursuant to letters patent issued by King George V in 1917. However, sources reported that it was unclear whether she would use that title, noting that not all members of the royal family who are eligible for a title choose to use one. An 8 March 2023 statement by a spokesperson for Lilibet's parents confirming her baptism days earlier marked the first time that her parents had publicly used her title of "princess", with the announcement referring to her as "Princess Lilibet Diana". The official website of the royal family was updated to use the words "Princess Lilibet of Sussex" on 9 March 2023. It was reported that any titles would be used in formal settings, but not in everyday conversations by her parents.

See also
Family tree of the British royal family
List of living British princes and princesses

References

|-

2021 births
Living people
21st-century American people
21st-century English people
American children
American people of Danish descent
American people of English descent
American people of German descent
American people of Greek descent
American people of Russian descent
American people of Scottish descent
British princesses
Daughters of British dukes
English children
English people of African-American descent
English people of Danish descent
English people of German descent
English people of Greek descent
English people of Russian descent
English people of Scottish descent
Family of Charles III
House of Windsor
Markle family
Mountbatten-Windsor family
People from Santa Barbara, California
Prince Harry, Duke of Sussex
Royal children